Orthology is the study of the correct speaking or the right use of words in language. The word comes from Greek ortho- ("correct") and -logy ("science of"). This science is a place where psychology, philosophy, linguistics and many other fields of learning come together. The most noted use of Orthology is for the selection of words for the language of Basic English by the Orthological Institute.

The book, The Meaning of Meaning, by C.K. Ogden and I.A. Richards, is an important book dealing with orthology.

References 

Language